The 2018–19 Associate international cricket season was from September 2018 to April 2019. The International Cricket Council (ICC) granted Twenty20 International (T20I) status to matches between all of its Associate members from 1 July 2018 (women's teams) and 1 January 2019 (men's teams). As a result, many teams were able to play official T20I cricket for the first time. The season included all T20I/WT20I cricket series mostly involving ICC Associate members, that were played in addition to series covered in International cricket in 2018–19.

Season overview

November

China women in South Korea

January

Zimbabwe women in Namibia

2019 Thailand Women's T20 Smash

2019 ACC Western Region T20

Rwanda women in Nigeria

March

2019 Spain Triangular T20I Series

April

Botswana women in Namibia

2019 Victoria Tri-Series

Myanmar women in Singapore

Myanmar women in Indonesia

2019 Central American Cricket Championship

Costa Rica women in Mexico

See also
 International cricket in 2018–19

References

2018 in cricket
2019 in cricket
International cricket competitions in 2018-19